2 Samuel 2 is the second chapter of the Second Book of Samuel in the Old Testament of the Christian Bible or the second part of Books of Samuel in the Hebrew Bible. According to Jewish tradition  the book was attributed to the prophet Samuel, with additions by the prophets Gad and Nathan, but modern scholars view it as a composition of a number of independent texts of various ages from c. 630–540 BCE. This chapter contains the account of David becoming king over Judah in Hebron. This is within a section comprising 1 Samuel 16 to 2 Samuel 5 which records the rise of David as the king of Israel, and a section comprising 2 Samuel 2–8 which deals with the period when David set up his kingdom.

Text
This chapter was originally written in the Hebrew language. It is divided into 32 verses.

Textual witnesses
Some early manuscripts containing the text of this chapter in Hebrew are of the Masoretic Text tradition, which includes the Codex Cairensis (895), Aleppo Codex (10th century), and Codex Leningradensis (1008). Fragments containing parts of this chapter in Hebrew were found among the Dead Sea Scrolls including 4Q51 (4QSam; 100–50 BCE) with extant verses 5–16, 25–27, 29–32.

Extant ancient manuscripts of a translation into Koine Greek known as the Septuagint (originally was made in the last few centuries BCE) include Codex Vaticanus (B; B; 4th century) and Codex Alexandrinus (A; A; 5th century).

Places 

Bethlehem
Giah
Gibeon
Gilead
Hebron
Jabesh-Gilead
Mahanaim

Analysis
The narrative of David's reign in Hebron in 2 Samuel 1:1–5:5 has the following structure:
A. Looking back to the final scenes of 1 Samuel (1:1)
B. David receives Saul's crown (1:2-12)
C. David executes Saul's killer (1:13-16)
D. David's lament for Saul and Jonathan (1:17-27)
E. Two kings in the land (2:1-3:6)
E'. One king in the land: Abner switches sides (3:7-27)
D'. David's lament for Abner (3:28-39)
C'. David executes Ishbaal's killers (4:1-12)
B'. David wears Saul's crown (5:1-3)
A'. Looking forward to David's reign in Jerusalem (5:4-5)

David's narrative of his ascension to the throne in Hebron is framed by an opening verse that looks backward to the final chapters of 1 Samuel (Saul's death and David's refuge in Ziklag) and closing verses that look forward to David's rule in Jerusalem (2 Samuel 5). The action begins when David received Saul's crown and concludes when he was finally able to wear that crown. David executes the Amalekite who claims to have assisted Saul with his suicide and those who murdered Ishbaal. Two laments were recorded: one for Saul and Jonathan and another shorter one for Abner. At the center are the two key episodes: the existence of two kings in the land (David and Ishbaal), because Joab's forces could not conquer Saul's territory on the battlefield. However, this was resolved when Ishbaal foolishly challenged Abner's loyalty, causing Abner to switch sides that eventually brought Saul's kingdom under Davidic rule.

David anointed king of Judah in Hebron (2:1–7)
David began his move with an enquiry to God and obeyed God's instruction to reside in Hebron, where David had obtained a power-base by his marriage to Abigail, the widow of Nabal (1 Samuel 25:3) and had sent gifts to its inhabitants from the spoils after his victory over the Amalekites (1 Samuel 30:31). It was also in Hebron, apparently the main town in the region, that David was 'anointed king over Judah' (verse 4), as a confirmation of the previous anointing by Samuel (1 Samuel 16:13), this time by 'the people of Judah', and later also by 'the elders of Israel' (2 Samuel 5:3). David had additionally secured support in northern areas with the marriages to Ahinoam of Jezreel and then to Maacah, daughter of Talmai of Geshur. David's overtures to the men of Jabesh-gilead, who had been loyal to Saul (verses 4b-7), were aimed to establish a relationship with that area, replacing to the one that ended with the death of Saul.

Verse 4
Then the men of Judah came, and there they anointed David king over the house of Judah.
And they told David, saying, "The men of Jabesh Gilead were the ones who buried Saul."
"The men of Judah": referring to an assembly of elders from David's own tribe, whom he had previously secured the support (1 Samuel 30:26).

Ish-bosheth made king of Israel in Mahanaim (2:8–11)
David's move was obviously a direct challenge to the house of Saul, which still had special ties with Gilead, Jezreel, and Geshur, together with other northern territories. Abner, Saul's cousin, made "Ishbaal" (a reading in
the Greek versions, for the Hebrew "Ishbosheth", 'man of shame'), Saul's remaining son, to be the king of Israel in Mahanaim (in the area of Gilead), which is east of the Jordan river, because the Philistines controlled the territory west of the Jordan, so the list of Ishbaal's domain was considered idealistic.

Verse 10
Ish-bosheth, Saul’s son, was forty years old when he began to reign over Israel, and he reigned two years. But the house of Judah followed David.

Battle of Gibeon (2:12–32)

Inevitably a civil war broke out between Israel and Judah, as both armies faced off Gibeon. First, 
Abner suggested a contest between twelve young men from each side, but the result was inconclusive as all contestants were killed (verse 16). The subsequent more general battle was to David's advantage as the Saulide army was forced to retreat (verse 17) with a significant incident that Asahel, the youngest brother of Joab and Abishai, the sons of Zeruiah (a sister of David; 1 Chronicles 2:16), was killed by Abner for not willing to stop pursuing him. Joab and Abishai's continuing pursuit that was halted when Abner reminded the people of 'their bond of kinship' (verse 26), so the hostilities, even with obvious advantage for David's side (verse 31), ceased, and the armies returned to their bases. Nonetheless, Joab was determined to avenge Asahel's death (3:17), when the opportunity came and David felt unable to restrain the violence of the sons of Zeruiah (3:39).

Verse 18
Now the three sons of Zeruiah were there: Joab and Abishai and Asahel. And Asahel was as fleet of foot as a wild gazelle. 
"Abishai": had one time accompanied David to Saul's camp (1 Samuel 26:6-22) and later became joint military leader with Joab, his brother.

See also

Related Bible parts: 1 Samuel 25, 1 Samuel 31, 2 Samuel 1, 1 Chronicles 2, 1 Chronicles 3

Notes

References

Sources

Commentaries on Samuel

General

External links
 Jewish translations:
 Samuel II - II Samuel - Chapter 2 (Judaica Press). Hebrew text and English translation [with Rashi's commentary] at Chabad.org
 Christian translations:
 Online Bible at GospelHall.org (ESV, KJV, Darby, American Standard Version, Bible in Basic English)
 2 Samuel chapter 2. Bible Gateway

02